Thatha or Thathi (English - Beard Band) is a type of cloth used by some Sikhs to fix their beards after spraying them with hair spray such as Taft, Fixo, Swift or with water or oil. Many orthodox Sikhs prefer to keep an open beard as a sign of respect, but some modern Sikhs prefer tying beards for neatness and appearance or even for the nature of the job such as Defence or Policing. This consists of spraying the beard with hair spray or beard spray, then tying it with rubber or beard pin. A thathi is tied on the chin This process takes 30 minutes to an hour.

Trimming /cutting of hairs is strictly not allowed in Sikhism .Hence cutting of beard is also not allowed.

Currently most of the Sikhs who do not cut beard use hair rubberband or hair gel to tug/set their beard hairs.

In essence only cutting/trimming of hairs ( hence beard) is prohibited . How uncut beard and uncut hairs are kept needs to be wisely decided.

As of now keeping a hair rubberband or hair gel tugged beard is accepted as a standard.

Why I mentioned “How uncut beard and uncut hairs are kept needs to be wisely decided.”is because a Sikh male who keeps his hairs on head uncut may say that I am keeping my hairs uncut but I want to go for pony tail. Accepted way of keeping uncut hairs in Sikhism is Turban for males and for females they may choose to go for braids and /or turban.

Same way as of now keeping a hair rubberband or hair gel tugged beard is accepted as a standard.The question of open versus fixed beard is not seen as worthy of debate, according to some Sikhs; they contend that Guru Gobind Singh Ji told Sikhs to keep uncut hair and they very well mantain their beards by sporting uncut beards

References

Indian fashion
Indian headgear
Sikh culture